Myke Cook is an Australian Rules football player who played for the Adelaide Football Club in the Australian Football League (AFL).

Originally from the Sandringham Dragons in the under 19s TAC Cup, Cook was drafted by Adelaide at number 38 in the 2007 AFL Draft.

Cook spent the 2008 AFL season playing with South Adelaide in the South Australian National Football League (SANFL) before making his AFL debut against Collingwood in Round One, 2009. He had the opportunity to kick a goal in his first AFL game after taking a contested mark in front of goals late in the game, but missed a relatively easy shot. He played two further games in his debut season, before beginning to secure a more regular berth in Adelaide's first 22 in 2010. Cook kicked his first goal in AFL football in his sixth game, against Melbourne, in Round Three, 2010, a snap around the body with only seconds remaining in the first quarter.

Cook was delisted by the Crows at the end of the 2011 AFL season and returned to the Sandringham Zebras in the Victorian Football League (VFL) with the hope of returning to the AFL.

References

External links

Adelaide Football Club players
1989 births
Living people
Australian rules footballers from Victoria (Australia)
Sandringham Dragons players
Sandringham Football Club players
South Adelaide Football Club players